Limnonectes selatan is a species of fanged frogs in the family Dicroglossidae. It is endemic to peninsular Malaysia, in the states of Pahang and Selangor.

References

 Matsui, Belabut & Ahmad, 2014 : Two new species of fanged frogs from Peninsular Malaysia (Anura: Dicroglossidae) Zootaxa, .
http://research.amnh.org/vz/herpetology/amphibia/Amphibia/Anura/Dicroglossidae/Dicroglossinae/Limnonectes/Limnonectes-selatan

selatan
Amphibians of Malaysia
Frogs of Asia
Amphibians described in 2014